Plasma gasification is in commercial use as a waste-to-energy system that converts municipal solid waste, tires, hazardous waste, and sewage sludge into synthesis gas (syngas) containing hydrogen and carbon monoxide that can be used to generate power. Municipal-scale waste disposal plasma arc facilities have been in operation in Japan and China since 2002. No commercial implementations in Europe and North America have succeeded so far. The technology is characterized by the potential of very high level of destruction of the incoming waste, but low or negative net energy production and high operational costs.

Plasma gasification is used commercially for waste disposal at five locations worldwide, representing a design capacity of 200 tonnes of waste per day in total, of which 100 tonnes per day is biomass waste.

Existing facilities

Wuhan, China (Wuhan Kaidi/Alter NRG, demonstration plant) 
In January 2013, Alter NRG commissioned a Westinghouse plasma gasification unit at a demonstration facility in Wuhan, China.  The plasma gasification unit was designed to process approximately 100 tons per day of biomass waste and convert it to clean syngas. The syngas is then converted into diesel fuel and other transportation fuels at the Kaidi facility.

Pune, Maharashtra, India (Maharashtra Enviro Power Limited)
A 72 tonne-per-day plasma-based hazardous waste treatment plant, located in Pune, India, was commissioned in 2008. It is based on Westinghouse Plasma Corporation's (WPC) plasma technology and reactor vessel design. The produced gas was meant to immediately be combusted in a steam boiler driving a stream turbine producing up to 1.6 MW (net) of electricity. However, the syngas utilization never worked, and due to technical issues no power has actually been produced at the plant.

Mihama-Mikata, Japan (Hitachi Metals Ltd.) 
It was certified after a demonstration period in 1999–2000. The Yoshii pilot plant was decommissioned when the pilot program ended in 2004.

It took over five years to start it up due to problems with size of the bottom of the reactor, carryover of sticky particulate, and the wrong choice of refractory. As a result, it lost its waste supply contracts and did not meet its design heat and material balance, so Hitachi Metals shut it down in 2013.

The Westinghouse Plasma plants used a fixed bed gasifier with plasma torches in the bottom, with addition of coke to add energy and act as a bed for slag, and addition of lime or similar fluxing agent.

National Cheng Kung University - Tainan City, Taiwan (PEAT International) 
PEAT International constructed a plasma arc waste disposal facility at National Cheng Kung University (NCKU) in Tainan City, Taiwan, which uses its proprietary Plasma Thermal Destruction Recovery method. The facility is able to handle  of waste per day from a variety of waste streams, including incinerator fly ash, medical waste, organic industrial process waste and inorganic sludges. It can also process waste consumer batteries and other materials, including heavy metal sludges, and refinery catalysts (waste streams that would generate valuable metal alloys), but no energy recovery efforts are reported. The facility was constructed as part of a comprehensive resource recovery facility funded by the Taiwanese government, marking the first time the government of Taiwan committed financial and technical resources to the utilization of plasma technology. It was commissioned in November 2004 and received its operating permit in January 2005.

USS Gerald R. Ford (CVN-78) Supercarrier – US Navy (PyroGenesis Canada Inc.)
A compact Plasma Arc Waste Destruction System (PAWDS) was installed by PyroGenesis Canada Inc. on board the aircraft carrier USS Gerald R. Ford (CVN-78). The system was designed to treat 200 kg/h combustible solid waste without energy recovery. The ship was christened in November 2013.

The waste must be sorted into metal, plastic, paper, food, and wood before the PAWDS can process it. The system is still operational as of 2021.

Planned facilities 

No planned waste plasma gasification projects are currently known.

Mothballed projects

Swindon, Wiltshire, England, UK (Advanced Plasma Power) 
In 2015 Advanced Plasma Power has been awarded 11 million GBP of funding from the Department of Transport and 6 million GBP from Ofgem to develop and erect the first commercial gasification facility based on the Gasplasma process. The process consists of gasification, plasma gas treatment, syngas polishing and gas engine power generation. It will be designed to produce gas for powering vehicles, power, heat and aggregate glass from processing 7500 tonnes of refuse-derived fuel annually. Construction is expected to start during 2016

. The installation will be used by Advanced Plasma Power for testing and development purposes rather than as a commercially operated plant.
As of December 2019 the Advanced Plasma Power company website had been taken off-line.

Hirwaun, Wales, UK (EnviroParks Limited) 
EnviroParks Limited plan (31/9/07) a consortium  to build an Organic Park in Tower Colliery at Hirwaun, South Wales. This includes a plasma gasification plant combined with advanced anaerobic digestion to divert municipal solid waste from the landfill. Enviroparks are currently collaborating with partner Europlasma of Bordeaux to provide the plasma gasification unit to the park.

As much as £60 million is being put into the project by EnviroParks Ltd and its partners, to establish organic waste and mixed waste treatment facilities next to the Tower Colliery at Hirwaun. Initially, though, an anaerobic digestion plant will be designed to handle  of organic wastes a year. According to the web site, as of early 2013 "...we hope to be receiving waste on the 20 acre site by 2014.". As of November 2016 the delayed gasification plant were still in the design phase according to EnviroParks. As of December 2019, the project has not updated the website since 2017.

Tees Valley Renewable Energy Center (Air Products/AlterNRG) 
A 49 MW power plant using plasma gasification was abandoned by the owner during the commissioning phase at Teesside in the UK.  Fully permitted, work on the site began in 2013.  Work continued on the first phase using AlterNRG gasifier, and construction of an identical phase began before the first phase was completed. Each plant used the "world's largest gasifier" to date, but neither was able to run, as the technology had not been proven at scale.  Commissioning on the first phase was started in late 2014.  By late 2015, Air Products halted construction on the second phase until it fixed the issues.  On April 4, 2016, Air Products announced it was leaving the waste-to-energy business, and was taking a write-down of $0.9-$1.0B.

Ottawa, Ontario, Canada (Plasco Energy Group Inc.) 
A new and different type of plasma arc waste conversion that uses plasma to refine gases produced during waste conversion. Plasco Energy Group's process does not use plasma to destroy waste, but rather to refine gases produced during waste conversion, in order to allow them to be used to run an internal combustion gas engine. On 24 October 2007, the Plasco Trail Road facility began delivering power to the grid.

In an update to local area residents on 6 December 2008, Plasco president Rod Bryden said delays at its facility were caused by malfunctioning machinery, not problems with the waste-to-energy technology.  Unlike conventional plasma gasification, the Plasco approach was to demonstrate the technology as an integrated plant at commercial scale at its own expense.  This resulted in enormous investment cost, but a proven product.

In December 2012, Plasco concluded a contract with the city of Ottawa for the construction of a three train commercial plant.  The plant would process up to 405 tonnes/day of municipal solid waste, producing 0.9 MW-hrs of net electrical power, 300 liters of water suitable for irrigation, and 150 kg of non-leachable aggregate for each tonne of waste processed.

On 28 August 2013, an article in the Ottawa Citizen reported that the Ottawa City Council had voted for the second time to extend a deadline by which Plasco was required to have arranged the $200 million required to construct the commercial scale plasma gasification facility near the Trail Road landfill.  The company now had until December 2014 to arrange financing.

In August 2014, Black & Veatch declared the technology suitable for commercialization, as it had demonstrated net power generation through GE Jenbacher IC engines, commercially acceptable availability, and pristine environmental performance.  In December of the same year, the New Economy Magazine awarded Plasco a prize as "the world's best waste management technology".

Despite this, having failed to receive expected government aid, the investors chose not to pursue the construction of the Ottawa plant and put the company into creditor protection in 2015.  It was purchased out of creditor protection later that year, and is currently marketing its advanced technology.  Plasco Energy has since changed its business model from Build Own Operate and limited it to supply of equipment and services .

Hurlburt Field, Florida, USA (PyroGenesis Canada Inc.) 
On April 26, 2011, the Air Force Special Operations Command (AFSOC) inarguated its Transportable Plasma Waste to Energy System (TPWES) facility, located at Hurlburt Field, near Fort Walton Beach Florida, USA.  The facility was designed, constructed and commissioned by Montreal-based PyroGenesis Canada Inc., and the unit deployed at the facility was based on the company's Plasma Resource Recovery System (PRRS) technology.  The plant was designed to process 10.5 metric tons per day of municipal solid waste, as well as hazardous and biomedical waste.  The syngas generated by the process was fed to an internal combustion engine to produce electricity, while the inorganic fraction of the waste feed was converted into an inert, vitrified slag which could allegedly be used for building materials. The system was designed to be energy neutral and transportable.

The plant, which cost $7.4 million to construct, was closed and sold at a government liquidation auction in May 2013.  The opening bid was $25.  The winning bid was sealed.

East Luther / Grand Valley, Ontario, Canada (Navitus Plasma Inc) 
Navitus Plasma Inc. proposed the installation of a system named "DEEP" "Dufferin Eco Energy Park" within East Luther Grand Valley located in the County of Dufferin (approximately 45 minutes north of Toronto) and planned to take all municipal garbage for the county to this facility. In 2014 project DEEP was reported to be likely to be shelved. As of April 2016 no more recent traces of project DEEP was found on the public internet.

St. Lucie County, Florida, USA (GeoPlasma) 
The first plasma-based waste disposal system in the USA was announced in 2006 in St. Lucie County, Florida. The county stated that it hopes to not only avoid further landfill, but completely empty its existing landfill —  of waste collected since 1978 — within 18 years. The plant was originally scheduled to come into operation in 2009, but experienced several setbacks. The public health and environmental threats from incinerators coupled with the uncertainty of the community's ability to produce such large quantities of waste on a consistent basis have led GeoPlasma to submit a new proposal for a much smaller facility that would convert  of waste per day. Plans were to begin building the $120 million facility in 2011. In April 2012, St. Lucie officials announced that they had terminated the contract with GeoPlasma thereby ending the project.

Tallahassee, Florida, USA (Green Power Systems) 
The city of Tallahassee, Florida has signed the largest plasma arc waste to energy contract (35 MW) to date with Green Power Systems to process  daily from the city and several surrounding counties.  Completion of the project was scheduled for October 2010, but canceled in 2008.

Vancouver, British Columbia, Canada (Plasco Energy Group Inc.) 
A proposed Plasma arc gasifier has been planned for the Metro Vancouver area. However residents of the area have protested. Metro Vancouver is currently conducting an RFP process to determine a long-term solution for waste management. Plasco is not proposing that Metro Vancouver discontinue the RFP process, but rather to establish an interim solution that can quickly address the shortfall in landfill capacity, while also providing a facility that will allow Metro Vancouver to closely scrutinize and evaluate this new technology as part of its long-term decision making process.  In 2008, the EPC Task Force recommended against the project.

Port Hope, Ontario, Canada (Sunbay Energy Corporation) 
Sunbay Energy is currently obtaining the required approvals from Provincial authorities and intends to have the facility operational during the 4th Quarter of 2009. This project appears to have subsequently chosen an approach other than plasma gasification.

Jackson, Georgia, USA (PR Power Company)
PR Power Co. plans to open a plant south of Atlanta, near Jackson, Georgia, that will use a "plasma torch" to vaporize tires down to their natural elements — mainly hydrocarbons and scrap steel. The gases will be converted to electricity for sale to electric utilities and the scrap steel will be sold at an estimated $50 a ton.

Red Deer, Alberta, Canada (Plasco Energy Group Inc.)
Plasco was preparing to start construction on a commercial-scale facility in Red Deer, Alberta in the Summer of 2009. This facility, which was to be the company's first commercial plant, was expected to be completed by the end of 2010, however in February 2012 it was announced that because the city would only give the plant 10% of its garbage Plasco pulled out of the project, effectively killing it.  Red Deer MP and supporter of the Plasco project, Bob Mills (Conservative Party of Canada), criticized the city saying "and so, the project died due to a lack of garbage."

Alcalá de Henares, Madrid, Spain (Fomento de Construcciones y Contratas) 
The regional government of Madrid, Spain, announced in 2008 the installation of a plasma-based waste disposal system in the city of Alcalá de Henares. The plan would have treated 220,000 tons of waste per year. The public health and environmental threats from incinerators, coupled with the fact that the place was environmentally protected led to the revision of the whole project, changing the emplacement and choosing an approach different than plasma gasification

'Re-invent the Toilet'
Delft University (TUD) participated in a contest by the Bill & Melinda Gates Foundation, 'Re-invent the toilet'. The solution proposed by TUD included a self-contained toilet that used microwaves to create plasma and gasify human waste. The toilet was intended for use in India  and other parts of the world where a reliable source of water is not available. The plasma based proposal was not among the three awarded when the challenge was concluded in 2012

Energy Park Peterborough, England, UK (Tetronics)
Energy Park Peterborough - the UK's First Green Energy Park, which was to be managed by Peterborough Renewable Energy was granted consent by the Government Department for Energy and Climate Change (DECC) in November 2009. It should take in mixed waste and – through a combination of recycling, gasification and plasma-enhanced waste recovery – recycle and remanufacture it, producing reusable products and renewable energy in the process. Tetronics was to supply the Plasma Hazardous Waste Treatment Technology. The technology should have turned the Air Pollution Control (APC) residue generated from the Biomass Power Plant into bricks and tiles for the building industry, thereby; ensuring close to zero residues to be landfilled.  Construction was scheduled to begin in 2012. The Energy Parks plans in Peterborough were scrapped in November 2015.

References

External links 
 PEAT International - Plasma Thermal Destruction & Recovery Technology (PTDR)
 Advanced Plasma Power
 Department of Trade and Industry - Using thermal plasma technology to create a valuable product from hazardous waste

Sustainable technologies
Plasma processing
Thermal treatment